Angarayanllur (East) is a village in the Udayarpalayam taluk of Ariyalur district, Tamil Nadu, India.

Demographics 

As per the 2001 census, Angarayanallur (East) had a total population of 2944 with 1471 males and 1473 females.

References 

Villages in Ariyalur district